The Martian Chronicles is a 1950 science fiction short story fixup by Ray Bradbury.

The Martian Chronicles may also refer to:

 The Martian Chronicles (miniseries), a 1980 television miniseries based on the Bradbury book
 The Martian Chronicles (video game), a 1996 game based on the Bradbury book
 "The Martian Chronicles" (Supergirl), a 2017 episode of the TV series Supergirl

See also
 Crónicas marcianas, a Spanish late-night talk show which ran from 1997 to 2005
 , an Italian adaptation of the Spanish talk show which ran from 2004 to 2005
 Martian (disambiguation)